Sudhindra Bose (1883 – May 26, 1946), a pioneer in teaching Asian politics and civilization at the Iowa State University in the United States, was born in Keotkhali near Dacca, in the then Bengal Presidency.

Biography

Sudhindra Bose was born in Keotkhali and studied at Dacca Jubilee School, Hashara Kalikishore High English School, Munshiganj High School, and the Comilla Victoria School and Comilla Victoria College (where his brother Satyendranath Bose became principal) of University of Calcutta from 1901-1903. He received a John Ings Medal and moved to the United States in 1904 and enrolled as a student at Park University, Missouri from 1904-1906. While at the university he worked for The Daily Maroon. He then transferred to the University of Illinois, where he earned his B.A. in 1907 and an M.A. in English in 1909.  Dr. Bose received a Ph.D. degree in political science from the University of Iowa in 1913. He died May 26, 1946 of heart disease at the age of 63, in Iowa City, Iowa. He married Swiss fellow-student Anne Zimmerman in 1927. She taught French at the University of Iowa between 1944 and 1946 and wrote a biographical note on Sudhindra following his death.

Academic career
From 1913 until his death in 1946, Dr. Bose was an instructor in the Department of Political Science at Iowa, first as Assistant in Political Science and then as Lecturer in Oriental Politics. He wrote four books between 1916 and 1934, as well as many articles for American and Indian periodicals. Dr. Bose was a correspondent for the Des Moines Register. He spoke on the lecture circuit and traveled widely in Asia and Europe.

Publications
 
 Bose, Sudhindra (1920), Fifteen Years in America, Arno Press, New York

References

1883 births
1946 deaths
Bengali Hindus
Emigrants from British India to the United States